John Kilday "Jock" Ferguson (15 January 194613 February 2010) was a Scottish-born Australian politician. Born in Glasgow, Scotland, Ferguson worked as a fitters apprentice delegate to the Boilermakers Union. He served in the British Merchant Navy before moving to New Zealand. Arrived in Western Australia in 1976 to work as a fitter in the Pilbara and Gascoyne regions. Later Ferguson became a member of the AMWU (Australian Manufacturing Workers Union) and rose to become the union's secretary for Western Australia in 2000. He also held a City and Guilds Trade Certificate (Engineering). In 2008, he was elected to the Western Australian Legislative Council as a Labor Party member, representing East Metropolitan Region. His term commenced on 22 May 2009. Ferguson died after a heart attack at his home on 13 February 2010.

References

1946 births
2010 deaths
Members of the Western Australian Legislative Council
Scottish emigrants to Australia
Politicians from Glasgow
Machinists
Australian Labor Party members of the Parliament of Western Australia
21st-century Australian politicians